The Khattak tribe are a prominent Pashtun tribe located in the Khattak territory, which consists of Karak, Nowshera, Kohat districts of Khyber Pakhtunkhwa, Pakistan.

History

Khushal Khan Khattak
A warrior poet by the name of Khushal Khan Khattak (1613–1690) was once the chief of this tribe, and his contributions to Pashto literature are considered as classic texts. His life and times are one of the most chronicled and discussed subjects in Pashtun history, as he was active on the political, social and intellectual fora of his times. He was a most voluminous writer, and composed no less than three hundred and sixty literary works, both in the Pashto and Persian languages.

His poetry revolves around concepts of Pakhtunwali; Honour, Justice, Bravery and Nationalism and his works have been translated into numerous languages, English and Urdu being the primary ones.

Older references
According to Nimatullah's 1620 work History of The Afghans, the Khattaks are amongst the oldest of the Afghan tribes.

The Sattagudai were a people mentioned by Herodotus in connection to people under the influence of the Achaemenid Empire.

Herodotus, Book 3, 91. (In this and the two succeeding passages the historian is giving a list of the Achaemenian satrapies and their peoples.) 

Herodotus, without assigning a name to the satrapy, tells us that Darius' yth Satrapy was inhabited by four tribes, the Sattagudai, the Gandarioi, the Dadikai, and the Aparutai.

The addition of the Aparutai/Aparidai correspondence helps to buttress the case for finding in Herodotus traces of names which carry through to the present day. Bellew has gone further and identified the Sattagudai with the famous Khatak tribe.
"The Pathans 55O B.C.-A.D. 1957" printed St Martin's Press 1958 by MacMillan and Company Limited"

Sattagudai
Numerous historians identify the Khattak with the Sattagudai.

Sir Olaf Caroe, The Pathans 550BC 1957AD:

"Let us now refer to the third passage cited, in which Herodotus, without assigning a name to the satrapy, tells us that Darius' yth
Satrapy was inhabited by four tribes, the Sattagudai, the Gandarioi, the Dadikai, and the Aparutai.

Bellew has gone further and identified the Sattagudai with the famous Khatak tribe, and the Dadikai with an obscure branch of Kakars whom he calls Dadi."

Khattaks and Shetaks

Sir Olaf Caroe, The Pathans 550BC 1957AD:

"Neither Khataks nor Shitaks appear by name until the period of publication of genealogies under the Mughals, and the time of Akbar's dealings with the Khataks for the protection of the highway to Peshawar. Babur indeed in his memoirs mentions the Karranis (Karlanis) whom he encountered in 1505 around Bannu along with the Niazis and Isakhel. It is probable that this reference of his is to Khattaks or Shitaks, or both, for both are Karlani tribes, and the other Karlanis who live in that area, Wazirs and Bangash, Babur mentions by name when he comes to them."

It is thus clear that Babur & other Mughals in their descriptions identify Khattaks & Shetaks together without any differentiation.

In Pashtun history

Sir Olaf Caroe, The Pathans 550BC 1957AD:

Theory of Israelite descent

Khattak tribe has oral traditions and legendary history of descent from the Israelites.

Khushal expresses that the Khattak reputation for fierceness and valor stems from the fact that Khattaks and Afghans have been nursed by the Lioness's (King Saul's wife) milk.

One of the first progenitors of the modern tribe is Manal. Manal is considered to be a modification of Manas from the word Manasseh. In his book The Armies of India, A.C. Lovett declares the Khattaks to be a widely enlisted tribe, who also lay claim to the Pashtun Jewish descent.

Theory of descent from the Greeks
After the creation of Pakistan, some Pakistani scholars, suggested a Greek descent for the Khattaks. However, from the Histories of Herodotus, Herodotus, Book 3, 91., it is clear that a tribe by the name of SattaGydae (or Sattagudai) were already settled in the area around current day Ghor in Afghanistan and paid as tribute coinage and materials to the Greeks when they subjugated these areas:

"The Sattagudai and the Gandarioi and the Dadikai and the Aparutai, who were all reckoned together paid 170 talents."

Later Bellew, Caroe and other historians both Pashtun and Western through their works identified the Sattagudai with the famous Khatak & Shitak tribes. "The Pathans 550 B.C.-A.D. 1957" printed St Martin's Press 1958 by MacMillan and Company Limited"

Though all Afghan DNA  including Khattak DNA has minor contributions from haplogroups more common to the Greeks, these are minor enough to rule out a direct lineage. Together with works from Herodotus and more recent historians, the theory of Khattak descent from the Greeks is unfounded.

Afridi and Khattak history
Sir Olaf Caroe, "The Pathans 550BC - 1957AD" :

"The Afridis and Khataks lumped together as Karlanis, can be held to reflect a knowledge that they represented a more aboriginal stock, which only later absorbed the characteristics of the invaders. In other words, it is not surprising that in looking for a prototype in the oldest recorded history bearing on this region we hit on the ancestor of the Pakhtun."

Molding and amalgamation
Sir Olaf Caroe, "The Pathans 550BC - 1957AD" :

"This is not to assert that the ethnic or linguistic stock can be traced through to tribes of similar names today. The case would be rather that these were sub-stratum agglomerations of people who, through contact with later-comers, modified their language and were assimilated to later cultures, but retained in the more inaccessible places sufficient of their older inspirations to boast their original names. The theory does at least give a starting-point to Pathan history & the stock belief in the Bani Israel."

Notables

 Khushal Khan Khattak (1603-1689), A Pashtun tribal leader, poet, warrior who had organised tribes to fight against the Mughal Empire
 Sami al Haq - (1937-2018), Regarded as the "Father of the Taliban" 
 Pervez Khattak, (1950) 22nd Chief Minister of Khyber Pakhtunkhwa Pakistan and current Minister of Defence of Pakistan
 Ajmal Khattak, (1925-2010) in Akora Khattak was a Pakistani politician, writer, Pashto poet, Khudai Khidmatgar, former President of Awami National Party
 Ghulam Faruque Khan (1899–1990) was a dynamic bureaucrat, politician, and industrialist of Pakistan. He belonged to the village Shaidu (Khan Khel) in Nowshera District. His contribution to Pakistan's industrial development he is sometimes described as "The Goliath who Industrialized Pakistan".
 Pareshan Khattak, (b. 10 December 1931 - d. 16 April 2009) from Karak Pakistan. His real name was Ghamay jan khattak "Pashto" پښتو" غمے جان خټک", he was a former Vice-Chancellor, Pashto poet and writer and former Chairman University Grants Commission of Pakistan. His books titled “Pukhtana Kochay,” “Dozakhi Pakhto,” “Drana Pukhtana,”

See also
 Pashtun
 Pashtun culture
 Zazi

References

Further reading
 
 

Karlani Pashtun tribes
Pashto-language surnames
Social groups of Afghanistan
Social groups of Pakistan
Middle East
Groups claiming Israelite descent
Greco-Bactrian Kingdom